The Mariamite Maronite Order (abbreviated OMM), also called the Aleppians or Halabites), is a monastic order in the Levantine Catholic Maronite Church, which from the beginning has been specifically a monastic Church. The order was founded in 1694 in the Monastery of Mart Moura, Ehden, Lebanon, by three Maronite young men from Aleppo, Syria, under the patronage of Patriarch Estephan Douaihy (1670–1704).

Its name comes from the Arabic Halabiyyah, city of Aleppo monks. It is one of the three Lebanese congregations founded by Saint Anthony the Great. The name is in reference to the origin of the founders and first members of the order. On 9 April 1969, the order was named, in Latin, Ordo Maronita Beatae Mariae Virginis.

The second order is the Baladites (or Baladiyyah), country monks, the antonym of Halabiyyah. This order resulted from a split with the Aleppians. Pope Clement XIV sanctioned this separation in 1770.

The third Lebanese monastic order is the Antonin Maronite Order founded on August 15, 1700, by the Patriarch Gabriel of Blaouza (1704–1705).

See also
 Monastery of Qozhaya

Maronite religious institutes 

 Baladites
 Antonins
 Kreimists or Lebanese missionaries

Melkite religious institutes 
Basilian Chouerite Order
Basilian Salvatorian Order
Basilian Aleppian Order

References

External links 
 

Maronite orders and societies
Religious organizations established in 1694
1694 establishments in the Ottoman Empire